Vaastav: The Reality is a 1999 Indian Hindi-language action film written and directed by Mahesh Manjrekar and starring Sanjay Dutt, Namrata Shirodkar, and Sanjay Narvekar. It features Mohnish Behl, Paresh Rawal, Reema Lagoo and Shivaji Satam in supporting roles.

"The Reality" as described by the film's tagline, refers to the harsh realities of life in the Mumbai underworld. The film is said to be loosely based on the life of Mumbai underworld gangster Chhota Rajan.

The film released on 7 October 1999. It very well received by both critics and audiences, and it was extremely successful both in India and overseas. It was nominated for and won many awards. At Filmfare Awards, It was nominated in many category including Best Picture, Best Director and Best Actor. Sanjay Dutt won his first ever best actor award at Filmfare out of his four nominations in his career, regarded by critics unanimously amongst being one of Indian cinema's most memorable onscreen characters. Over the years, it has become a cult film.

The film was remade into Tamil language as Don Chera (2006). It was followed by the 2002 sequel Hathyar. In 2013, it was dubbed in Bhojpuri as Tohar Ko Thok Debe.

Plot 
Vaastav opens with a family performing the funeral rites of a person on a river bank. When the young son of the deceased asks his grandmother about the deceased, she begins to narrate the story.

As the film opens, Raghunath Namdev Shivalkar or "Raghu" and his best friend Chandrakant a.k.a "Dedh Footiya" (literally meaning "One and a half feet tall" in Hindi) struggle to find work in Mumbai. Raghu lives in a chawl with his retired father Namdev, mother Shanta and a graduate but unemployed brother Vijay. They decide to run a pav bhaji stall. They work diligently and are earning good profits. The business seems to be working out very well before the brother of a local goon Fracture Bandya and his men start visiting their stall. Continuously for somedays Fracture Bandya's men visit the stall in a drunken state and abuse Dedh Footiya. Raghu tells Dedh Footiya to not get involved in any argument with them. But one day, Fracture Bandya's men beat up Dedh Footiya badly. Unable to keep their emotions and anger in the face of abuse continuously for days, Raghu and Dedh Footiya accidentally kill Fracture Bandya's brother, not knowing who he is. Now on the run, the two of them soon kill Fracture Bandya and his men also, when the latter tries to find them and kill them both treacherously by arranging a meeting through Suleiman Bhai, a middle man in the Mumbai underworld. Raghu and Dedh Footiya now end up in the Mumbai underworld.

Vitthal Kaanya, a rival gang lord, offers Raghu and Dedh Footiya protection and later hires them both as hitmen. Raghu becomes a respected hitman, with Dedh Footiya as his accomplice. With Raghu in his gang, Vitthal Kaanya hits a peak in the Mumbai underworld. Later, Raghu is approached by the home minister Babban Rao and who asks Raghunath to work for him and uses Raghunath for his needs. Raghu agrees, much against the wishes of Assistant Inspector Kishore Kadam, a good friend of Raghu, who continues to help him by advising him and providing inside information. Vitthal Kaanya is soon killed by rival gangsters.

While Babban Rao relies on Raghunath, there are some others who despise Raghunath and are waiting in the sidelines to see when he makes an error. Raghunath does so, and Babban Rao is soon under serious pressure from the public and government. He issues a shoot-to-kill warrant for Raghunath. Dedh Footiya is killed in an encounter in order to take out Raghu from the hiding as he and Dedh Footiya killed a Parsi man. Then Kishore informs Raghu that the police have been ordered to kill him in an "encounter". Raghu is now on the run, both from the police and Babban Rao's men. Raghunath knows now that he must protect his wife, parents, and family, as they too are in danger. He realizes that there is no escape from this harsh reality. He arranges to meet Babban Rao with the help of Suleiman Bhai and kills Babban Rao as he would spoil others' lives like his in the future. In the process, Suleiman Bhai is also killed in an attempt to save Raghu.

Unable to save himself from the police, Raghu returns to his home and tells his mother to save him. He apparently has lost his mental balance, become crazy and starts hallucinating. His mother takes him away to safety. He tells her to take his gun and kill him, so she remembers how Raghu had once taught her how to use a gun, pulls the trigger and kills him.

As the film ends, the family is seen fulfilling the annual rites of Raghu on the Mumbai beach, as the film had begun, with Raghu's mother explaining all that happened to her young grandson and prays that his sins must be pardoned.

Cast 

 Sanjay Dutt as Raghunath "Raghu" Namdev Shivalkar
 Namrata Shirodkar as Sonia "Sonu" Shivalkhar, Raghu's wife
 Deepak Tijori as Sub-Inspector Kishore Kadam (Kisha)
 Sanjay Narvekar as Chandrakant "Dedh Footiya" Kumar
 Mohnish Bahl as Vijaykanth Namdev Shivalkhar, Raghu's brother
 Ekta Sohini as Pooja Shivalkar, Vijay's wife
 Shivaji Satam as Namdev Shivalkar, Raghu's father
 Reema Lagoo as Shanta Shivalkar, Raghu's mother
 Usha Nadkarni as Gayatri Devi, Dedh Footiya's mother
 Paresh Rawal as Suleiman bhai (Mandavali Baadshah)
 Mohan Joshi as Home Minister Babban Rao Kadam
 Ashish Vidyarthi as Vitthal Kaanya
 Himani Shivpuri as Laxmi Akka, Bordello Madam
 Mahesh Manjrekar as himself in a song
 Jack Gaud as Fracture Bandya
 Ganesh Yadav as Chhota Fracture
 Kishore Nandlaskar as Kamalkant Kumar, Dedh Footiya's father (drunkard)
 Achyut Potdar as Chacha, an old Muslim man who is murdered by Dedh Footiya
 Anand Abhyankar as a Parsi Man
 Bharat Jadhav as Raghu's friend
 Makarand Anaspure as Raghu's friend
 Satish Rajwade as Satya
 Atul Kale as Bhopu
 Nilesh Divekar as Raghu's friend
 Dhananjay Mandrekar as Commissioner of Police
 Jayant Savarkar as Pandit
 Kashmera Shah as an item number 'Jawani Se'

Soundtrack

Accolades

Legacy 
Reviewing the film for Rediff.com, Suparn Verma compared its theme to Hollywood films Scarface (1983), The Godfather (1972), and Indian films such as Satya (1998), Nayakan (1987) and Agneepath (1990). He felt the film offered "no new insight into the underworld" and added that it was "fast-paced and taut at times". However, he felt the film was "well shot and edited" and criticized the "lengthy dialogues". He concluded commending the acting performance of Sanjay Dutt and called it "one of the best performances of his career". He added, "From an easy-going guy to a broken man -- the role is essayed with great care by him, maintaining a consistency throughout." Mukhtar Anjoom of Deccan Herald felt Dutt, who looked "terrific", couldn't "hold the excitement for long" due to the "shaky screenplay".

Notes

References

External links 
 
 

1999 films
1990s Hindi-language films
Films set in Mumbai
Films shot in Mumbai
Films about organised crime in India
Films scored by Jatin–Lalit
Films directed by Mahesh Manjrekar
Indian gangster films
Indian action films
Indian crime drama films
Hindi films remade in other languages